Maltese dog refers both to an ancient variety of dwarf canine from Italy and generally associated also with the island of Malta, and to a modern breed of dog in the toy group. The contemporary variety is genetically related to the Bichon, Bolognese, and Havanese breeds. The precise link, if any, between the modern and ancient species is not known. Nicholas Cutillo suggested that Maltese dogs might descend from spitz-type canines, and that the ancient variety probably was similar to the latter Pomeranian breeds with their short snout, pricked ears, and bulbous heads. These two varieties, according to Stanley Coren, were perhaps the first dogs employed as human companions.

The Maltese does not shed. The Maltese is kept for companionship, ornament, or competitive exhibition.

Maltese dogs in antiquity 
The old variety of Maltese appears to have been the most common or favourite pet, or certainly household dog, in antiquity. Dogs of various sizes and shapes are depicted on vases and amphorae. On one Attic amphora from about 500 BC, excavated at Vulci in the nineteenth century and now lost, an illustration of a small dog with a pointed muzzle is accompanied by the word μελιταῖε, melitaie.

Numerous references to these dogs are found in Ancient Greek and Roman literature. Ancient writers variously attribute its origin either to the island of Malta in the Mediterranean, called  in Latin, – a name which derives from the Carthaginian city of that name on the island, Melite – or to the Adriatic island of Mljet, near Corfu and off the Dalmatian coast of modern Croatia, also called Melita in Latin. The uncertainty continues, but recent scholarship generally supports the identification with Malta.

In Greece in the classical period a variety of diminutive dog (νανούδιον/nanoúdion -"dwarf dog")  was called a Μελιταῖον κυνίδιον (Melitaion kunídion, "small dog from Melita"). In is unusual smallness it was variously likened to martens (ἴκτις/iktis) or pangolins.  The word "Melita" in this adjectival form, attested in Aristotle, refers to the island of Malta, according to Busuttil.  The Cynic philosopher Diogenes of Sinope, Aristotle's contemporary, according to the testimony of Diogenes Laertius, referred to himself as a "Maltese dog" (κύων.. Μελιταῖος/kúōn Melitaios). A traditional story in Aesop's Fables contrasts the spoiling of a Maltese by his owner, compared to life of the toilsome neglect suffered by the master's ass. Envious of the spoiling attentions lavished on the pup, the ass tries to frolic and be winsome also, in order to enter his master's graces and be treated kindly, only to be beaten off and tethered to its manger.

Around 280 BCE,  the learned Hellenistic poet Callimachus, according to Pliny the Elder writing in the Ist century CE, identified Melite – the home of this ancient dog variety – as the Adriatic island, rather than Malta. Conversely, the poem Alexandra ascribed to his equally erudite contemporary Lycophron, which is now thought to have been composed around 190 BCE, also alludes to the island of Melite, but identified it as Malta. Strabo, writing in the early first century AD, attributed its origin to the island of Malta.

Aristotle's successor Theophrastus (371 – c. 287 BC), in his sketch of moral types, Characters, has a chapter on a type of person who exercises a petty pride in pursuing a showy ambition to be particularly fastidious in his taste (Μικροφιλοτιμία/mikrophilotimía).  One feature he identifies with this character type is that if his pet dog dies he will erect a memorial slab commemorating his "scion of Melita."  Athenaeus, in his voluminous early 3rd century CE Deipnosophistae (12:518-519), states that it was a characteristic of the Sicilian Sybarites, notorious for the extreme punctiliousness of their refined tastes, to delight in the company of owl-faced jester-dwarfs and Melite lap-dogs (rather than in their fellow human beings), with the latter accompanying them even when they went to exercise in the gymnasia.

The Romans called them . During the first century, the Roman poet Martial wrote descriptive verses to a lap dog named "Issa" owned by his friend Publius. It has been claimed that Issa was a Maltese dog, and that various sources link this Publius with the Roman Governor Publius of Malta,  but nothing is known of this Publius, other than that he was an unidentified friend of Paulus, a member of Martial's literary circle.

The Maltese in modern times
Dog genomic experts state that despite the rich history of the ancient breed, the modern Maltese, like many other breeds, cannot be linked by pedigree to that ancient genealogy, but, rather, emerged in the Victorian era by regulating the crossing of existing varieties of dog to produce a type that could be registered as a distinct breed. The Maltese and similar breeds such as the Havanese, Bichon and Bolognese, are indeed related, perhaps through a common ancestor resulting from a severe bottleneck when a handful of petite canine varieties began to be selected for mating around two centuries ago.

In his work , the first history of its kind, Abbé Jean Quintin, Secretary to the Grand Master of the Knights of Malta Philippe Villiers de L'Isle-Adam, wrote in 1536 that, while classical authors wrote of Maltese dogs, which perhaps might formerly have been born there, the local Maltese people of his time were no longer familiar with the species.

John Caius, physician to Queen Elizabeth I, writing of women's chamber pets,   such as the Comforter or Spanish Gentle, stated that they were known as "Melitei" hailing from Malta, though the species he describes were actually Spaniels, perhaps of the recently imported King Charles Spaniel type. A variation of the latter was the Blenheim toy dog, bred by the Marlborough family, with its distinctive white and chestnut mantle. Red and white mantled varieties of these toy pets, the King Charles or Oxfordshire Blenheim breeds, were all the fashion in the 17th.century, down through the early decades of the 19th.century.

In 1837 Edwin Landseer painted The Lion Dog from Malta: The Last of his Tribe, a portrait of a dog named Quiz, a petite flossy white creature poised next to a huge Newfoundland dog, commissioned by Queen Victoria as a birthday present for her mother, the Duchess of Kent, whose dog it was. According to John Henry Welsh, shortly after Landseer's canvases, the London fancy of toy dog enthusiasts took to importing exemplars of the Chinese spaniel, with their short faces and snub noses, and crossbred these with pugs and bulldogs to select for puppies with a longer "feather" or fleecing on their ears and limbs. Some time later, the London market began to deal in what were called "Maltese" dogs. These had no known connection to that island, and one of the breeders, T. V. H. Lukey, associated with the English mastiff, stated that his own Maltese strain was imported from the Manilla Islands in 1841.

A strain of this type was accepted as a distinct class at the Agricultural Hall Show in Islington in 1862, when a breeder, R. Mandeville, took first prize and continued to do so in subsequent years. From 1869 to 1879, Mandeville swept the board of most shows in Birmingham, Islington, the Crystal Palace, and Cremorne Gardens, and his kennels were considered to have furnished the finest strain for subsequent Maltese breeding. From the 19th. century onwards, the requirement emerged for the Maltese to have an exclusively white coat. Despite the unknown provenance, by the close of the century, the dog-expert William Drury noted that nearly all English writers of that period associated the breed with Malta, without adducing any evidence for the claim.

A white dog was shown as a "Maltese Lion Dog" at the first Westminster Kennel Club Dog Show in New York City in 1877. From that time they were occasionally crossed with poodles, and a stud book, based on the issue of two females, was established in 1901. By the 1950s, this registry counted roughly 50 dogs in its pedigree table. The Maltese was recognised as a breed by the American Kennel Club in 1888. It was definitively accepted by the Fédération Cynologique Internationale under the patronage of Italy in 1955.

Characteristics 

The coat is dense, glossy, silky and shiny, falling heavily along the body without curls or an undercoat. The colour is pure white, however a pale ivory tinge is permitted. Adult weight is usually . It behaves in a lively, calm, and affectionate manner.

The Maltese does not shed. Like other white dogs, it may show tear-stains.

Use 
The Maltese is kept for companionship, for ornament, or for competitive exhibition. It is ranked 59th of 79 breeds assessed for intelligence by Stanley Coren.

See also 
 Lap dog
 List of dog breeds

Notes

Citations

Sources

External links

Bichon
Companion dogs
Dog breeds originating in Italy
FCI breeds
Maltese culture
Toy dogs